107.4 Telford FM was a commercial local radio station broadcasting in Telford, Shropshire and the surrounding areas of Bridgnorth and Newport from 3 May, 1999 until 20 September, 2010.

In 2010, the station was later renamed as 'The Severn' to match their sister station and it began to broadcast for more areas in Shropshire. The management and studio location stayed the same during this time.

See also 
 Shropshire Star
 The Severn
 The Wyre

MNA Broadcasting Websites 
106.5, 107.1 & 107.4 FM | The Severn - For Shrewsbury, North Shropshire and Telford & Wrekin
107.2 FM | The Wyre - For North Worcestershire (Wyre Forest District)
MNA Broadcasting - MNA Broadcasting website

Radio stations in Shropshire
Radio stations established in 1999
1999 establishments in England